The India women's cricket team toured New Zealand to play the New Zealand women's cricket team in January and February 2019. The tour consisted of three Women's One Day Internationals (WODIs), which formed part of the 2017–20 ICC Women's Championship, and three Women's Twenty20 International (WT20I) matches. The WT20I matches took place on the same day as the corresponding men's fixtures at the same venues.

In the third WODI of the series, India's captain Mithali Raj became the first woman to play in 200 ODI matches. India Women won the WODI series 2–1. New Zealand Women won the WT20I series 3–0.

Squads

Bernadine Bezuidenhout was ruled out of New Zealand's WT20I squad due to an injury and was replaced by Anna Peterson.

Tour match

50-over match: Central Districts Hinds v India Women

WODI series

1st WODI

2nd WODI

3rd WODI

WT20I series

1st WT20I

2nd WT20I

3rd WT20I

References

External links
 Series home at ESPN Cricinfo

2019 in women's cricket
2017–20 ICC Women's Championship
2018–19 Indian women's cricket
2019 in New Zealand cricket
cricket
International cricket competitions in 2018–19
New Zealand 2018-19
India 2018-19